The 1997 Lipton Championships was a tennis tournament played on outdoor hard courts. It was the 13th edition of the Miami Masters and was part of the Mercedes Super 9 of the 1997 ATP Tour and of Tier I of the 1997 WTA Tour. Both the men's and women's events took place at the Tennis Center at Crandon Park in Miami, Florida in the United States from March 20 through March 30, 1997.

Finals

Men's singles

 Thomas Muster defeated  Sergi Bruguera 7–6(8–6), 6–3, 6–1
 It was Muster's 2nd title of the year and the 45th of his career. It was his 1st Masters title of the year and his 8th overall.

Women's singles

 Martina Hingis defeated  Monica Seles 6–2, 6–1
 It was Hingis' 7th title of the year and the 12th of her career. It was her 2nd Tier I title of the year and her 2nd overall.

Men's doubles

 Todd Woodbridge /  Mark Woodforde defeated  Mark Knowles /  Daniel Nestor 7–6, 7–6
 It was Woodbridge's 3rd title of the year and the 55th of his career. It was Woodforde's 2nd title of the year and the 58th of his career.

Women's doubles

 Arantxa Sánchez Vicario /  Natasha Zvereva defeated  Sabine Appelmans /  Miriam Oremans 6–2, 6–3
 It was Sánchez Vicario's 2nd title of the year and the 75th of her career. It was Zvereva's 4th title of the year and the 66th of her career.

External links
 Official website
 ATP Tournament Profile
 WTA Tournament Profile

 
Lipton Championships
Lipton Championships
Miami Open (tennis)
Lipton Championships
Lipton Championships
Lipton Championships